South Main Street District may refer to:

South Main Street District (Middletown, Ohio)
South Main Street District (Poland, Ohio), listed on the National Register of Historic Places

See also
South Main Street Historic District (disambiguation)